Somalingapuram is a village in Merakamudidam mandal, located in Vizianagaram district of Andhra Pradesh, India.

References 

Villages in Vizianagaram district